Corkite is a phosphate mineral in the beudantite subgroup of the alunite group.  Corkite is the phosphate analogue of beudantite and with it, a complete solid solution range exists. Corkite will also form a solid solution with kintoreite.

Corkite is named after County Cork, Ireland; the location where the first notable amount was discovered in 1869.  Like many of the other minerals in the beudantite group, corkite is a relatively uncommon, secondary mineral that occurs in oxidation zones near hydrothermal base metal deposits. It occurs associated with pyromorphite, malachite, plumbojarosite, limonite  and quartz.

References 

Phosphate minerals
Sulfate minerals
Lead minerals
Iron minerals
Trigonal minerals
Minerals in space group 160
Beudantite group